Palmeria  may refer to:
 Palmeria (bird), the ʻAkohekohe, a genus of Hawaiian honeycreeper
 Palmeria (plant),  a plant genus in the family Monimiaceae
 Palmeria (diatom),  a centric diatom of the family Coscinodiscaceae